The Jamestown micropolitan area may refer to:

The Jamestown, New York micropolitan area, United States
The Jamestown, North Dakota micropolitan area, United States

See also
Jamestown (disambiguation)